The 2000 United States presidential election in Oklahoma took place on November 7, 2000, and was part of the 2000 United States presidential election. Voters chose eight representatives, or electors to the Electoral College, who voted for president and vice president.

Oklahoma was won by the Republican Party candidate, Texas Governor George W. Bush with a 21.88% margin of victory. Despite Vice President Al Gore's landslide loss in the state, he is the most recent Democrat to win any of its counties in a presidential election, namely Ottawa, Cherokee, Muskogee, Okmulgee, McIntosh, Hughes, Haskell, Latimer, and Choctaw. This was the last election until 2016 that any third-party candidates were granted ballot access in Oklahoma and the last time until 2020 that any county was won by only a plurality.

Results

By county

Counties that flipped from Democratic to Republican
Atoka (Largest city: Atoka)
Bryan (Largest city: Durant)
Caddo (Largest city: Anadarko)
Carter (Largest city: Ardmore)
Coal (Largest city: Coalgate)
Cotton (Largest city: Walters)
Craig (Largest city: Vinita)
Garvin (Largest city: Pauls Valley)
Greer (Largest city: Mangum)
Harmon (Largest city: Hollis)
Jefferson (Largest city: Waurika)
Johnston (Largest city: Tishomingo)
Kiowa (Largest city: Hobart)
Le Flore (Largest city: Poteau)
Love (Largest city: Marietta)
Marshall (Largest city: Madill)
Mayes (Largest city: Pryor Creek)
McCurtain (Largest city: Idabel)
Murray (Largest city: Sulphur)
Nowata (Largest city: Nowata)
Okfuskee (Largest city: Okemah)
Osage (Largest city: Hominy)
Pawnee (Largest city: Cleveland)
Pittsburg (Largest city: McAlester)
Pontotoc (Largest city: Ada)
Pushmataha (Largest city: Antlers)
Seminole (Largest city: Seminole)
Sequoyah (Largest city: Sallisaw)
Tillman (Largest city: Frederick)

By congressional district
Bush won all 6 congressional districts, including one held by a Democrat.

Electors

The electors of each state and the District of Columbia met on December 18, 2000 to cast their votes for president and vice president. The Electoral College itself never meets as one body. Instead the electors from each state and the District of Columbia met in their respective capitols.

The following were the members of the Electoral College from the state. All were pledged to and voted for George W. Bush and Dick Cheney:
Steve Byas
James Cruson
Paul Hollrah
Kristal Markowitz
Bob McDowell
Donald O'Nesky
Tom Prince
George W. Wiland

The slates of electors for the defeated candidates are as follows:

Reform: Robert Kiwanis Bell, Jr., Isabel Faith Lyman, Patrick S. J. Carmack, Ivette P. Farmer, Earl David Shaffer, William Bruce Charles, Gregory D. Brown, Mary Patricia Ziglinski

Democrat: George Nigh, Carma Lee Brock, Edmund Synar, Beulah Vernon, Jay Parmley, Rhonda Walters, Mary Jac Rauh, Obera Bergdall

Libertarian: Charles Burris, Agnes Regier, Christine M. Kane, Mary Laurent, Anne Fruits, Jack Litherland, David Lewis, Lynn Atherton

See also
 United States presidential elections in Oklahoma
 Presidency of George W. Bush

References

Oklahoma
2000
Presidential